Ikhar is a village in the Bharuch district of the Indian state of Gujarat. The village has a population of 12,342.

Notable people
 Ibrahim Ali Patel , Indian Politician
 Munaf Patel, cricketer
Soyeb Sopariya , cricketer

References

Villages in Bharuch district